is the tenth major single (13th overall) by Japanese pop rock band Scandal, released in April 2011. It was released in three versions: a limited CD+DVD edition type A, a limited CD+DVD edition type B, and a regular CD-only edition. The title track was used as the theme song for the animated film Tofu Kozō. First pressings of the limited editions came with a button badge and a greeting event ticket, while first pressings of the regular edition came with a Tofu Kozō wide cap sticker, a special booklet, and a greeting event ticket. The single reached number 3 on the Oricon weekly chart and charted for ten weeks, selling 31,694 copies.

Theme for Windows 8
"Haruka" was re-released on October 23, 2012, with a different cover, when the single's second track, "Satisfaction", was used as the theme for a Windows 8 TV commercial.

Track listing

References 

2011 singles
Scandal (Japanese band) songs
Japanese film songs
Songs written for animated films